Craig Jones (born 20 March 1987) is retired footballer who played as a midfielder. Previously, he was club captain at Bury. He is a three times Welsh Premier League champion. He previously played for Welsh clubs Airbus UK Broughton, Aberystwyth Town, Rhyl, TNS and Connah's Quay.

Club career
Jones' career started with Airbus UK Broughton and Aberystwyth Town. He joined Rhyl in the May 2007, winning a Welsh Premier League championship medal with the club and representing them in Europe. He then joined The New Saints in May 2009. He played for the club in qualifying rounds of the UEFA Champions League, against clubs such as Helsingborg, Anderlecht, and Bohemians scoring in both home legs against the Belgian and Irish champions. In July 2012, he played his final matches for The New Saints playing a significant role in both legs of the second-round qualifying matches of the UEFA Champions League against Swedish Treble-winning side (comprising Super Cup, League and Swedish Cup titles) Helsingborg. In total he scored 25 goals in 111 appearances for the club.

In January 2012 he went on trial with Leeds United for seven days. After attracting interest from several English League and European Clubs, Jones signed a two-year deal with League One club Bury in August 2012, after Bury paid out an undisclosed fee for his services from TNS.

He was released by Bury at the end of the 2017–18 season.

In August 2018, Jones returned to the Welsh Premier League signing for Connah's Quay Nomads. Jones made six appearances in all competitions for the Nomads, including playing in a Scottish Challenge Cup victory over Falkirk where he assisted the winning goal. He departed the club three months later after struggling to attain the required level of fitness.

International career
Jones won 9 caps for Wales at the semi-pro under-23 level, and captained the side once. He was selected for the senior semi-pro team for the 2008 Four Nations, scoring a hat-trick against Gibraltar.

Personal life
His father Brynley was also a professional football player, having played for Chester City in the Football League, as well as Bangor City and Oswestry Town.

Career statistics

Honours
with Rhyl
Welsh Premier League champion: 2008–09
Welsh League Cup runner-up: 2008

with The New Saints
Welsh Premier League champion: 2009–10 & 2011–12
Welsh Premier League runner-up: 2010–11
Welsh Cup winner: 2012
Welsh League Cup winner: 2009, 2010 & 2011

Individual
 Welsh Premier League Young Player of the Season: 2009–10
 Welsh Premier League Team of the Year: 2008–09, 2009–10 2010–11, 2011–12

References

External links
  (contains errors)
 Profile on the official Bury FC website
 

1987 births
Living people
Sportspeople from Chester
Welsh footballers
Wales under-23 international footballers
English footballers
English people of Welsh descent
Association football wingers
Aberystwyth Town F.C. players
Airbus UK Broughton F.C. players
Rhyl F.C. players
The New Saints F.C. players
Bury F.C. players
Cymru Premier players
English Football League players